A criminal charge is a formal accusation made by a governmental authority (usually a public prosecutor or the police) asserting that somebody has committed a crime.  A charging document, which contains one or more criminal charges or counts, can take several forms, including:
 
 complaint
 information
 indictment
 citation
 traffic ticket
 
The charging document is what generally starts a criminal case in court. But the procedure by which somebody is charged with a crime and what happens when somebody has been charged varies from country to country and even, within a country, from state to state.
 
Before a person is found guilty of a crime, a criminal charge must be proven beyond a reasonable doubt.

Punishment 
There can be multiple punishments due to certain criminal charges. Minor criminal charges such as misdemeanors, tickets, and infractions have less harsh punishments.  The judge usually sentences the person accused of committing the charges right after the hearing. The punishments generally include fines, suspension, probation, a small amount of jail time, or alcohol and drug classes. If the criminal charges are considered more serious like a felony, then there is a lengthier process for determining the punishment. Felonies include the most serious crimes such as murder and treason. In addition to the trial that decides innocence or guilt, there is a separate trial (after one is convicted) that determines the punishment(s) for the criminal charges committed.

Rights when facing criminal charges

Europe 
Article 6 of the European Convention on Human Rights protects the right to a fair trial.

United States 
In the United States, people facing criminal charges in any situation enjoy certain rights under the Constitution. These rights include the right to remain silent, habeas corpus, the right to an attorney, and double jeopardy. It is important for someone who faces criminal charges to know their rights so they can take the proper action to exercise their rights. Among those rights are a criminal suspect's Miranda Rights which are read to a suspect prior to interrogation while in the custody of the police. If a suspect is not given a Miranda warning prior to interrogation it is possible that the suspect's statements will be excluded from evidence in a later criminal prosecution.

Prosecution 
Many people avoid criminal charges by staying out of the state where they committed the crime. A person facing state criminal charges is always prosecuted in the state where they committed the charges.  A person may be able to get away with minor violations like a ticket, but they will not be able to hide from something like a misdemeanor or a felony.  
There are about sixty criminal charges that are considered more serious that people face every day. These charges can range from less serious actions such as shoplifting or vandalism to more serious crimes such as murder.

Reckoning 
A person may be unaware that they have been charged. They can contact an attorney to ascertain if they have charged with any crime. A police officer may also charge someone after investigating the possible crime committed.

References 

 

 

Criminal procedure
Documents